Helenesee is a lake in Brandenburg, Germany. Its surface area is ca. 250 ha. With a depth of 56.63 m, the Helenseee is the second deepest lake in Brandenburg, only surpassed by the lake Großer Stechlinsee. It is situated approximately 8 kilometers in the south of Frankfurt (Oder). It was formed after the flooding of a former open-pit mining which started in 1958.

Lakes of Brandenburg
Frankfurt (Oder)